Hymenopappus artemisiifolius, the oldplainsman, is a North American species of flowering plant in the daisy family. It has been found only in the south-central United States, in Texas, Arkansas, and Louisiana. Its natural habitat is in sandy soils of prairies and open woodlands.

It produces 20-60 flower heads per stem, each head with 40–60 white, yellow, purple, or red disc flowers but no ray flowers. Its flowers attract butterflies.

Varieties
Hymenopappus artemisiifolius var. artemisiifolius - Texas, Arkansas, Louisiana
Hymenopappus artemisiifolius var. riograndensis B.L.Turner - Río Grande Valley in southern Texas

References

artemisiifolius
Endemic flora of the United States
Flora of Arkansas
Flora of Louisiana
Flora of Texas
Plants described in 1836
Flora without expected TNC conservation status